The following lists events that happened during 2020 in the Maldives.

Incumbents 

 President: Ibrahim Mohamed Solih
 Vice President: Faisal Naseem

Events

Ongoing 
COVID-19 pandemic in the Maldives

 1 February – The Maldives rejoined the Commonwealth  after showing evidence of functioning democratic processes and popular support.
 7 March – The Maldives confirmed its first two cases of COVID-19, who were foreign employees at Kuredhoo Island Resort.
 12 March – A public health emergency is declared.
 25 August – Former Maldivian President Maumoon Abdul Gayoom tested positive for COVID-19.

Sport 

 Association football

 2019–20 Dhivehi Premier League
 2020 SAFF Championship

References 

 
2020s in the Maldives
Years of the 21st century in the Maldives
Maldives
Maldives